Godfrey v. Georgia, 446 U.S. 420 (1980), was a United States Supreme Court case in which the Court held that a death sentence could not be granted for a murder when the only aggravating factor was that the murder was found to be "outrageously or wantonly vile."

The Court reversed and remanded the Georgia death penalty sentence because, under Furman v. Georgia, such a factor did not help sentencing judges or juries avoid arbitrary and capricious infliction of the death penalty.

External links
 

United States Supreme Court cases
Capital punishment in Georgia (U.S. state)
1980 in Georgia (U.S. state)
1980 in United States case law
United States Supreme Court cases of the Burger Court
United States death penalty case law